Seth Llewellyn Milliken (December 12, 1831 – April 18, 1897) was a U.S. Representative from Maine.

Early life
Born in Montville, Maine, the son of William Milliken and Lucy P. Perrigo. Milliken attended the common schools and Waterville College (now Colby College) before graduating from Union College, Schenectady, New York, in 1856.

Family life

Milliken had two children, a daughter Maud Milliken and a son Seth M. Milliken.

Maud Milliken was a native of Augusta, Maine. She descendeded on her father's side from Sir James Milliken, of Scotland, who was knighted by King James for his military achievements, and on her maternal grand-father's side from one of the Counts of Perigneux, of France, whose burial place, with its elaborate tomb and monument, are at Pere Lachaise. Maud Milliken, after receiving a rudimentary education at her Maine home, attended the Allen School, near Boston, and studied music, both in Boston and New York. She possesses a clear, sweet, soprano voice, and leads the church choir at home. Maud Milliken accompanied her father to Washington for a number of winters.

Career
Milliken served as member of the Maine House of Representatives in 1857 and 1858.
Milliken moved to Belfast, Maine.
He served as clerk of the Supreme Judicial Court 1859-1871.
He studied law and was admitted to the bar in 1871, but did not practice.
He served as delegate to the Republican National Convention in 1876 and 1884.

Milliken was elected as a Republican to the Forty-eighth and to the seven succeeding Congresses and served from March 4, 1883, until his death in Washington, D.C., April 18, 1897.
He served as chairman of the Committee on Public Buildings and Grounds (Fifty-first and Fifty-fourth Congresses).
He was interred in Grove Cemetery, Belfast, Maine.

See also
List of United States Congress members who died in office (1790–1899)

References
Notes

Sources

External links
 

1831 births
1897 deaths
Milliken family
Republican Party members of the Maine House of Representatives
People from Montville, Maine
Colby College alumni
Union College (New York) alumni
People from Belfast, Maine
Republican Party members of the United States House of Representatives from Maine
19th-century American politicians